Aurora Center is a census-designated place (CDP) in Aurora County, South Dakota, United States. The population was 22 at the 2020 census.

Geography
Aurora Center is located at  (43.862198, -98.353642).

Aurora's location is more prone to tornadic activity than elsewhere in South Dakota.

Demographics

As of the census of 2000, there were 7 people, 3 households, and 0 families residing in the CDP. The population density was 55.3 people per square mile (20.8/km2). There were 3 housing units at an average density of 23.7/sq mi (8.9/km2). The racial makeup of the CDP was 100.00% White.

There were 3 households, out of which 33.3% had children under the age of 18 living with them, 33.3% were married couples living together, and 66.7% were non-families. 33.3% of all households were made up of individuals, and 33.3% had someone living alone who was 65 years of age or older. The average household size was 2.33 and the average family size was 4.00.

In the CDP, the population was spread out, with 42.9% under the age of 18, 42.9% from 18 to 24, and 14.3% who were 65 years of age or older. The median age was 21 years. For every 100 females, there were 250.0 males. For every 100 females age 18 and over, there were 100.0 males.

The median income for a household in the CDP was $4,583, and the median income for a family was $0. Males had a median income of $0 versus $0 for females. The per capita income for the CDP was $4,700. There were no families living below the poverty line and 66.7% of the population, including none under 18 and none of those over 64.

See also
 List of census-designated places in South Dakota

References

External links

Census-designated places in Aurora County, South Dakota
Census-designated places in South Dakota